Amol Rathod is an Indian cinematographer who primarily works for Tollywood and Bollywood. His first movie as a cinematographer was Oh, My God  in 2008.

Career
Amol started his career as an assistant camera man in Ram Gopal Varma films and later turned as Cinematographer.

Filmography

References

External links
 

Telugu film cinematographers
Telugu people
Living people
Year of birth missing (living people)